Kõrboja peremees (The Master of Kõrboja) is a novel by Estonian author A. H. Tammsaare. It was first published in 1922.

Based on the novel, the same-name feature film is made in 1979 in Tallinnfilm. The film is directed by Leida Laius.

References

Estonian novels
1922 novels